Māravijaya attitude or mara vichai (Khmer: ព្រះពុទ្ធផ្ចាញ់មារ, preah pud (buddha) p'chanh mea) is an attitude of Buddha in Thai art of which the seated Buddha is putting his hand in the relax posture towards to the ground, loosely holding his knee. The other hand is on his lap. His eyes, sometimes closed, look down to the ground. The gesture of the hand reaching the ground is called bhumisparshamudra, which also refers to the attitude as well. The gesture refers to the episode which the Buddha calling the earth to witness. 

In Khmer art, this attitude of Buddha is called preah pud (buddha) p'chanh mea which means the sacred buddha defeating the enemy (māra).

The attitude refers to the episode that he was reaching the enlightenment and being disturbed by maras. Learning that the maras asked him to give up, he touched the ground and called the Phra Mae Thorani to help him fight with the maras. Thoranee called tonnes of water and flooded away the maras. The episode results in the name Mara Vichai which means the "Victory (vichai) over the Mara". Other Thai names are Chana Mara (ชนะมาร; victory over the Mara) and Sadoung Mara (สะดุ้งมาร; striking fear into the Mara)

Notable examples 
As mentioned, the Maravijaya Buddha is the most commonly-built Buddha, some of the notable Buddharupas in Thailand that are built depicting the Maravijaya are;
Great Buddha of Thailand
Phuket Big Buddha
Golden Buddha of Wat Traimit
Phra Achana in Sukhothai Historical Park

Gallery

References 

Thai Buddha Attitudes translations
translated from :th:ปางมารวิชัย on Thai Wikipedia

External links

Buddhist art
Buddhist iconography
Laotian art
Thai Buddhist art and architecture
Buddhism in Laos
Cultural depictions of Gautama Buddha